The Kick is the third studio album by English singer and songwriter Foxes. It was released on 11 February 2022 through PIAS Recordings. The album was preceded by the singles "Sister Ray", "Dance Magic", "Sky Love", "Absolute" and "Body Suit".

Background 
In April 2021, Foxes released the EP Friends in the Corner after a four-year hiatus from music. A month earlier, while announcing the EP, she teased a new album and stated that it would be featuring different material from the EP.

Release and promotion 
The album was preceded by the lead single "Sister Ray". The single was announced on 10 September and released 5 days later on 15 September. The second single, "Dance Magic", was released on 13 October. On 2 November, Foxes announced the third single, "Sky Love", would be released the next day. On the same day, she announced through her socials that her third studio album was going to be titled The Kick, and revealed a release date of 11 February 2022, as well as the album's cover art. She later announced she was embarking on The Kick Tour 2022, with a set opening date in Glasgow on 11 February 2022.

"Absolute" was released as the fourth single on 7 January 2022. The fifth single, "Body Suit", was released on 26 January 2022, it served as the final single before the album's release.

Critical reception

The Kick received critical acclaim from music critics. At Metacritic, which assigns a normalised rating out of 100 to reviews from mainstream critics, the album has an average score of 80 out of 100, based on four reviews.

Track listing

Charts

Release history

References 

2022 albums
Foxes (singer) albums